George Alexander Gibson FRSE LLD (19 April 1858–1 April 1930) was a Scottish mathematician and academic author.

Life
He was born on 19 April 1858 in Greenlaw in Berwickshire the third son of Robert Gibson JP (1830–1903). He attended the free church school in the parish, and showing great promise, went to the University of Glasgow where he graduated with an MA in 1882 and immediately joined the University staff.

In 1889, aged 29, he was elected a Fellow of the Royal Society of Edinburgh. His proposers were William Thomson, Lord Kelvin, Prof William Jack, Sir Thomas Muir and George Chrystal. He served as the Society's Vice President from 1917 to 1920. He also served as president of the Edinburgh Mathematical Society. In 1895 he became a Professor of Mathematics at the Glasgow and West of Scotland Technical College. In 1909 he returned to the University of Glasgow as a Professor, replacing his mentor Prof William Jack.

Gibson lived on campus at 10 The University, Glasgow. The University of Edinburgh awarded him an honorary doctorate (LLD) in 1905 and the University of Glasgow did likewise in 1927, the year of his retiral.

Death
He died at Scotstounhill in Glasgow on 1 April 1930. On his death the Gibson Memorial Lecture was founded. The first lecturer in this series was Albert Einstein. Other lecturers include Charles Coulson and Edward Collingwood.

Family

In 1890, he married Nellie Stenhouse Hunter, daughter of James D. Hunter, while still a student. They had three children.

Publications

References

1858 births
1930 deaths
Alumni of the University of Glasgow
Academics of the University of Glasgow
Scottish mathematicians
Scottish non-fiction writers
People from the Scottish Borders